Víctor Manuel Báez Ceja (born 29 October 1959) is a Mexican politician in the National Regeneration Movement (Morena) party. From 2009 to 2011, he served as a federal deputy in the LXI Legislature of the Mexican Congress representing Michoacán from the Party of the Democratic Revolution.

In 2015, Báez, by this point a member of Morena, was elected mayor of Pátzcuaro. He was the first PT-Morena municipal president in the city. In 2018, he won reelection.

References

1959 births
Living people
Politicians from Michoacán
Party of the Democratic Revolution politicians
21st-century Mexican politicians
Morena (political party) politicians
Deputies of the LXI Legislature of Mexico
Members of the Chamber of Deputies (Mexico) for Michoacán